T. platensis  may refer to:
 Toxodon platensis, an extinct mammal species of the late Pliocene and Pleistocene epochs indigenous to South America
 Triatoma platensis, an assassin bug species

See also
 Platensis